Desiree Dolron (born 16 April 1963) is a Dutch visual artist who lives and works in Amsterdam, the Netherlands. Her photographs portray a variety of styles and subjects, including documentary photography, still life, portraits and video works. Dolron is best known for her series Xteriors (2001-2018).

Early life
Dolron was born in Haarlem, the Netherlands.

Work 
Dolron has traveled extensively to find subjects for her photography.
One of Dolron's ongoing series is titled Xteriors, which consists of photographic portraits drawn from the style of paintings by Old Masters.

Publications 

 Stranded, 1990. Amsterdam: Design by Mevis & Deursen, Binded by André van der Zalk. This Volume contains eighteen selenium toned silver prints. The book was produced in an edition of ten.
 Religion and Death 1992/1992, Amsterdam: Published by Alexander Valeton Design by Mevis & Deursen, Binded by André van der Zalk 
Exaltation - Images of Religion and Death, Publisher DDH Foundation, Text by Manfred Heiting, Laurens ten Kate, Kees Fens & Joop de Jong, Designed by Mevis & Van Deursen  
Desirée Dolron 2005. Publisher Terra Lannoo in conjunction with the retrospective exhibition 'Desiree Dolron' in the Hague Museum of Photography, design Maarten Evenhuis kindly supported by Michael Hoppen Gallery. 
Desirée Dolron 2006. Publisher Éditions Xavier Barral, essays by Pierre Assouline, Mark Haworth-Booth. Accompanied the exhibition Exaltation-Gaze-Exteriors at The Institut Néerlandais.  
Xteriors 2017, Publisher Raven Foundation Amsterdam, Design by Irma Boom essays by Wim Pijbes and Charlotte Cotton

Selected solo exhibitions 
1993 Desiree Dolron, De Nederlandsche Bank, Amsterdam
1994 Selected Works, Galerie Serieuze Zaken, Amsterdam, Religion and Death, Kunsthal, Rotterdam 
1995 Desiree Dolron, Aschenbach Gallery. Amsterdam Silence of the Eye, RijksMuseum, Public space, Amsterdam Desiree Dolron, Stedelijk Museum het Domein, Sittard 
1998 Behind the Eye, Groninger Museum, Groningen Gaze, Flatland Gallery, Utrecht 
Photographie, Arles Exaltation, Fototeca, Havana, Cuba 
2001 Xteriors, Loerakker Gallery, Amsterdam 
2002 Statement, Paris Photo, Paris. Te dí todos mis Sueños, Loerakker Gallery, Amsterdam Desiree Dolron, Les Rencontres Internationales de la Photographie, Arles Exaltation, Fototeca, Havana, Cuba
2003 Te dí todos mis sueños, Michael Hoppen Gallery, London 
2004 Xteriors, Michael Hoppen Gallery, London 
2005 Retrospective, Fotomuseum Den Haag, Den Haag 
2006 Desiree Dolron, Exaltation, Gaze, Xteriors, Instituut Néerlandais, Paris 
2007 Hotel California, Wallraf-Richartz-Museum & Foundation Corboud, Köln 
2009 Desiree Dolron, Fotografins Hus, Stockholm 
2010 Desiree Dolron, Fototeca de Cuba, Havana 
2013 Desiree Dolron, Solo presentation, Art Basel, Hong Kong 
2015 Desiree Dolron, Solo for Grimm at Paris Photo L.A. 
2016 I will show you fear in a handful of dust, RavenFoundation, Amsterdam 
2017 Forever Someone Else, GRIMM, Amsterdam, Desiree Dolron, A Retrospective, Singer Museum, Laren 
2018 Complex Systems, GRIMM, NY

Collections 
 Stedelijk Museum het Domein, Sittard
 Museum for Religious Arts, Uden 
 Groninger Museum, Groningen
 Gemeentemuseum Den Haag, The Hague
 Stedelijk Museum, Amsterdam
 The Museum of Fine Arts, Houston
 Victoria & Albert Museum, London
 Museo Reina Sofia, Madrid
 Solomon R. Guggenheim Museum, New York
 Joseph M. Cohen collection
National Museum of Qatar

Awards 
Dolron was awarded the Laureate Prix de Rome, Amsterdam, The Netherlands (1996); in 2019 she has been honored with the title of Artist of the Year by the American friends of the Museums in Israel, New York.

References

External links

1963 births
Living people
Dutch women photographers
21st-century Dutch photographers
21st-century women photographers